Walterinnesia morgani is a species of venomous snakes in the family Elapidae that is native to the Middle East.

Description and behaviour
(See the article on the genus at Walterinnesia)

Distribution
The range of the species encompasses Syria, western Iran, southern Turkey, Iraq, eastern Saudi Arabia and Kuwait. The type locality is Khuzestan Province in south-western Iran.

References

 
morgani
Reptiles of the Middle East
Taxa named by François Mocquard
Reptiles described in 1905